Don Steffes (January 13, 1930–May 24, 2018) was an American politician who served in the Kansas State Senate as a Republican from 1993 to 2000.

Steffes was born in Olpe, Kansas as the second of four children. He graduated high school in 1947 and served for 18 months in the U.S. Army before enrolling in Emporia State University, graduating in 1952. After graduation, he worked on oil pipeline construction and married Janie Steele in Gladewater, Texas.

He returned to Kansas and earned his master's degree at Emporia State, while working for various Chambers of Commerce in the state. In 1968, he became president of a bank in McPherson, Kansas. He became active in local Republican party politics, and in 1992 ran for a vacant seat in the Kansas Senate. He served two full terms in the Senate; after the 2000 elections, he retired and began splitting his time between Kansas and Arizona. He died in McPherson in 2018.

References

1930 births
2018 deaths
Republican Party Kansas state senators
People from McPherson, Kansas
20th-century American politicians
American bank presidents
Emporia State University alumni